Tetravinyltin (also known as tetravinylstannane) is an organotin compound with a chemical formula of C8H12Sn.

Uses
Upon heating, a mixture of tetravinyltin and tin tetrachloride undergo disproportionation to form divinyltin dichloride, vinyltin trichloride, and trivinyltin chloride in high yields. A study about this can be found in the Journal of American Chemical Society.

Tetravinyltin cannot be used for therapeutic or diagnostic purposes and must only be used for research. It can also be used for thin film deposition.

Hazards
According to the European Chemicals Agency, tetravinyltin is flammable in liquid and gas form. It is also toxic when in contact with skin, inhaled, and swallowed. Therefore, personal protective equipment must be used in handling and proper caution applied during use.

References

External Links
 TETRAVINYLTIN - ChemicalBook
 Tetravinylstannane at Encyclopedia of Reagents for Organic Synthesis
 Stannane, tetraethenyl at NIST WebBook

Organotin compounds
Tin(IV) compounds
Vinyl compounds